is a Japanese slalom canoer who competed in the early to mid-1990s. Competing in two Summer Olympics, she earned her best finish of 17th in the K-1 event in Atlanta in 1996.

External links
Sports-Reference.com profile

1970 births
Canoeists at the 1992 Summer Olympics
Canoeists at the 1996 Summer Olympics
Japanese female canoeists
Living people
Olympic canoeists of Japan